The Antiphon Painter was an Athenian vase painter of the early 5th century BC. He owes his name to a double Kalos inscription of Antiphon on the dinos stand in the Antique collection of Berlin (Inventory number F 2325). He was active between 500 and 475 BC in Athens as a painter of the red-figure style in the largest workshop of the 5th century. He learned his handicraft in the workshop of Euphronios and Onesimos. There he worked closely with them, the Kalmarer Painter and other painters.

There are about 100 drinking containers of his (primarily kylikes) known to us. They almost exclusively depict  the life of the aristocratic youth of Athens. They are shown as athletes, in symposia, in komos scenes, and with their horses or in arms. Representations of women – in particular Hetairai – are rare, as are mythological topics. When he depicts mythological subjects, they are usually the heroic acts of Herakles or Theseus. One of his bowls possibly refers to the Battle of Marathon (Orvieto, Collection Faina).

A special speciality of the painter were his red-figure Eye-cups. The Antiphon Painter was the last artist to create these.

External links

Works at the Metropolitan Museum of Art
Kylix attributed to Antiphon Painter at the Johns Hopkins Archaeological Museum

5th-century BC deaths
Ancient Greek vase painters
Anonymous artists of antiquity
Year of birth unknown